Teachers' World was a British publication of the first half of the 20th century which featured a range of teaching material, poems and short stories for children. It is most associated with Enid Blyton who contributed heavily to it in the 1920s and 1930s.

References

1920s in England
1930s in England
Children's magazines published in the United Kingdom
Defunct magazines published in the United Kingdom
Education in England
Education magazines
Enid Blyton
Magazines with year of establishment missing
Magazines with year of disestablishment missing